The following are the football (soccer) events of the year 1957 throughout the world.

Events
 February 8 – The Confederation of African Football is founded at a meeting in Khartoum, Sudan.
 October 19 – Scottish club Celtic F.C. beat their deadliest rivals Rangers F.C. 7–1 in the Scottish League Cup final at Hampden Park in Glasgow.
 November 20 – Dutch club Ajax Amsterdam makes its European debut by defeating DDR's SC Wismut (1-3) in the first round of the European Cup.

Winners club national championship
 : River Plate
 : R. Antwerp F.C.
 : Emelec
 : Manchester United
 : AS Saint-Etienne
 : Vasas SC
 : Hapoel Tel Aviv F.C.
 : A.C. Milan
 : Ajax Amsterdam
 : Olimpia Asunción
 : FC Dynamo Moscow
 : Real Madrid
 : IFK Norrköping
 : Borussia Dortmund

International tournaments
 African Cup of Nations in Sudan (February 10 – 16 1957)
 
 
 
 1957 South American Championship in Peru (March 7 – April 6, 1957)
 
 
1957 British Home Championship (October 6, 1956 – April 6, 1957)
 
 Copa Julio Argentino Roca in Brazil (July 7 – 10 1957)

Births
 January 5 – Karl Allgöwer, German footballer
 January 11 – Bryan Robson, English footballer and manager
 February 1 – Walter Schachner, Austrian footballer and manager
 February 9 – Gordon Strachan, Scottish footballer and manager
 February 28 – Jan Ceulemans, Belgian footballer and manager
 March 12 – Patrick Battiston, French footballer
 May 5 – Said Azimshah Garibzada, Afghan-born former football player and trainer
 May 9 – Fulvio Collovati, Italian footballer
 July 15 — Craig Martin, Canadian footballer
 September 3 – Walter Kelsch, German footballer
 September 6 – Zhivko Gospodinov, Bulgarian footballer
 September 11 – Plamen Markov, Bulgarian footballer
 September 11 – Preben Elkjær, Danish footballer
 September 26 – Klaus Augenthaler, German footballer and manager
 October 8 – Antonio Cabrini, Italian footballer
 October 25 – Piet Wildschut, Dutch footballer
 October 27 – Glenn Hoddle, English footballer and manager

Deaths

January
 January 18 – Alvaro Gestido, Uruguayan midfielder, winner of the 1930 FIFA World Cup. (49)

October
 October 5 – José Leandro Andrade, Uruguayan midfielder, winner of the 1930 FIFA World Cup. (55, Tuberculosis)

 
Association football by year